Humphrey Iddoh Mwanza (22 April 1949 – 3 July 2015) was a Zambian politician. He was a member of the National Assembly for the Solwezi West constituency for the Movement for Multi-Party Democracy since the 2006 elections. He was re-elected in the 2011 elections.

Mwanza died at age 66 after an operation to remove a stomach tumor in the University Teaching Hospital in Lusaka on 3 July 2015. Teddy Kasonso of the United Party for National Development was elected as Mwanza's successor in September 2015.

References

1949 births
2015 deaths
Members of the National Assembly of Zambia
Movement for Multi-Party Democracy politicians